was a district located in Yamaguchi Prefecture, Japan.

As of 2003, the district had an estimated population of 7,946 and a density of 27.37 persons per km2. The total area was 290.35 km2.

Former towns and villages
 Tokuji

Merger
 On October 1, 2005 - the town of Tokuji, along with the towns of Aio, Ajisu and Ogōri (all from Yoshiki District), was merged with the old city of Yamaguchi (2nd Generation) to create the new and expanded city of Yamaguchi (3rd Generation). Both Yoshiki District and Saba District were dissolved as a result of this merger.

Former districts of Yamaguchi Prefecture